N53 may refer to:

Roads 
 N53 road (Ireland)
 Nebraska Highway 53, in the United States
 Santiago–Tuguegarao Bypass Road, in the Philippines

Other uses 
 N53 (Long Island bus)
 BMW N53, an automobile engine
 , a submarine of the Royal Navy
 , a minelayer of the Royal Norwegian Navy
 London Buses route N53
 Stroudsburg–Pocono Airport, in Monroe County, Pennsylvania, United States